Laosanthus is a genus of plants in the ginger family, Zingiberaceae. It contains only one known species, Laosanthus graminifolius, first described in 2001 and endemic to Laos.

References

Endemic flora of Laos
Zingiberoideae
Zingiberaceae genera
Monotypic Zingiberales genera